Luffield Priory was a monastic house in Luffield Abbey, straddling the counties of Buckinghamshire and Northamptonshire, England.

The priory was founded by Robert de Beaumont, 1st Earl of Leicester between 1118 and 1135, and dissolved 1494.

Though the vast majority of the priory's land and buildings were in Buckinghamshire, the church itself stood in Northamptonshire; consequently it was the Archdeacon of Northampton who inducted Priors.

Priors of Luffield
Malgerus
William - 1151
Ralph - 1170
Ralph - 1174
John
William
Roger
William de Brakele - 1237
Ralph de Selveston alias Luffield
Will de Esteneston - 1274
Adam de Henred - 1279
John de Houton
Richard de Silveston (acting Prior for one month)
Peter de Shaldeston - 1285
William de Brackeley - 1293
John de Westbury - 1322
William de Skelton - 1343
William de Horwoode - 1350
John Pyre or Perry - 1381
John Horwode - 1394
John Hals - 1419
John Pinchebeck - 1442
William Rogers - 1467
Thomas Rowland - 1489

References

Monasteries in Northamptonshire